Bloody Payroll is a 1976 Italian noir-poliziotteschi crime film  written and directed by Mario Caiano. Author Roberto Curti described the film as more of a film noir than a poliziottesco.

Cast
Claudio Cassinelli as Raul Montalbani, aka "The Cat"
Silvia Dionisio as Layla
John Steiner as Fausto
Vittorio Mezzogiorno as  Walter
Elio Zamuto as  Police Commissioner Foschi
Biagio Pelligra as  Tropea
Salvatore Puntillo as  Inspector Tucci

Release
Bloody Payroll was shown in Italy on March 5, 1976. It grossed a total of 1,015,886,510 Italian lire.

The score of the film is credited to Pulsar Music Ltd. It is a funk styled score performed by pianist Enrico Pieranunzi and guitarist Silvano Chimenti.

See also 

 List of Italian films of 1976

Notes

References

External links

1976 films
1970s Italian-language films
Films directed by Mario Caiano
Italian crime films
1976 crime films
1970s Italian films